HD 112410 is a star in the southern constellation of Musca. It has a yellow hue and is too dim to be readily visible to the average sight, having an apparent visual magnitude of 6.86. The distance to this star is 513 light years based on parallax, and it is drifting further away from the Sun with a radial velocity of 73 km/s. It has an absolute magnitude of 1.22.

This is an aging giant star with a stellar classification of G8III. It is cooling and expanding along the red giant branch, having evolved off the main sequence after exhausting its core supply of hydrogen fuel. At present it has 10 times the Sun's radius. Mass estimates range from 1.21 up to 2.32 times the mass of the Sun. The star has a lower metallicity the Sun – what astronomers term the abundance of elements with more mass than helium – and it is spinning with a projected rotational velocity of 3.3 km/s. It is radiating 50.5 times the luminosity of the Sun from its enlarged photosphere at an effective temperature of 4,793 K.

Planetary system
HD 112410 has a substellar companion calculated to have a mass at least 9.2 times that of Jupiter and an orbital period of 124.6 days at a typical separation of approximately 0.57 astronomical units (AU). As of 2013, this is the nearest exoplanet orbiting around any ascending red giant branch star, and second-closest planet to a giant star after the companion of HIP 13044.

References

G-type giants
Planetary systems with one confirmed planet
Musca (constellation)
CD −64 676
112410
063242